Staré Město is a municipality and village in Frýdek-Místek District in the Moravian-Silesian Region of the Czech Republic. It has about 1,500 inhabitants.

Etymology
The name literally means "Old Town". It was used to distinguish from the newly established town of Frýdek.

Geography
Staré Město lies in the historical region of Cieszyn Silesia, in the Moravian-Silesian Foothills. It is located on the confluence of Ostravice and Morávka rivers.

History

The predecessor of Staré Město was a village called Jemnice, which was first mentioned in a deed of bishop Wawrzyniec from 1223. Later, the town of Frýdek was founded in the vicinity, first mentioned in 1386, and absorbed Jemnice. The village in the area of Jemnice was first mentioned as Staremiesto in 1434.

Politically the village belonged initially to the Duchy of Teschen. In 1327 the duchy became a fee of Kingdom of Bohemia. In 1573 it was sold as one of 16 villages and the town of Frýdek and formed a state country split from the Duchy of Teschen.

After World War I and fall of Austria-Hungary, it became a part of Czechoslovakia. In March 1939 it became a part of Protectorate of Bohemia and Moravia. After World War II it was restored to Czechoslovakia. Staré Město was later merged into the town of Frýdek-Místek, but after a petition it separated as an independent municipality on 24 November 1990.

Sights
The landmark of Staré Město is the Church of Saint Joseph. It was built in the neo-Romanesque style in 1902–1904.

References

External links

 

Villages in Frýdek-Místek District
Cieszyn Silesia